Edward Jay Allen (April 27, 1830 – December 26, 1915) was a pioneer, entrepreneur, and businessman.

Edward Jay Allen traveled west over the Oregon Trail in 1852 and made his way to Puget Sound, arriving in December of that year. Allen played a significant role in the early history of Washington Territory and left a detailed account of his years in the west (1852–1855).  Upon returning to Pittsburgh, he married, raised a family, served with distinction in the Civil War as a colonel in the 155th Pennsylvania Infantry, and in later life became quite prosperous as secretary/treasurer of the Atlantic and Pacific Telegraph Company. He was a member of the South Fork Fishing and Hunting Club that gained notoriety in the aftermath of the Johnstown, Pennsylvania flood. Allen also was a poet and writer of music lyrics and published several works including Hiou Tenas Iktah ("A Lot of Trifles" in Chinook jargon). In addition, he was a mentor of the artist John White Alexander.

Early life
The Allen family emigrated from Warwickshire, England, crossing the Atlantic on the ship Anacreon and arriving in New York City on September 4, 1827. The youngest of six children, Edward Jay Allen was born to Edward and Millicent Bindley Allen on April 27, 1830. After nearly three years in New York City, the Allen family moved to Pottsville, Pennsylvania, a bustling coal center that supplied Philadelphia’s fuel needs via a newly constructed canal. In 1834 the family moved again, traveling by Conestoga wagon to Pittsburgh, where they lived thereafter. The senior Edward Allen made his living as a bricklayer and later as a construction contractor. He saw to it that his three sons and three daughters were well educated and versed in the classics. Edward Jay Allen attended Pittsburgh's South Ward School and the University of Pittsburgh (then known as the Western University of Pennsylvania. Suffering from a severe long-term lung ailment, Allen found respite in the summer of 1851 wandering the hills of Westmoreland County, Pennsylvania with friends. Looking for relief from his illness and to avoid the dreary prospect of a career working in a food warehouse, Allen conceived the idea of a trip west.

Out West
Allen was unusual among the emigrants heading to Oregon. He was college-educated, knew nothing about farming, and traveled without a family. He hoped, in addition to securing property under the Donation Land Claim Act, that the trip west would improve his health.

Leaving Pittsburgh in the spring of 1852, Allen began his six-month journey, joining a wagon train consisting primarily of farmers from Wapello County, Iowa. Allen kept a diary  and composed fourteen letters sent to his family from various locations along his route. These letters were published in the Pittsburg Dispatch newspaper and saved into a scrapbook by his sister Rebecca. This scrapbook became the basis of two books written about Allen's adventures by Dennis M. Larsen and Karen L. Johnson.

Allen's western journey officially began May 11, 1852 at Council Bluffs, Iowa (a.k.a. Kanesville). He experienced a typical Oregon Trail crossing until reaching the Snake River Valley in Idaho. Limping along on a badly sprained ankle, Allen concluded that he could walk no further. He decided to turn his wagon bed into a boat and float down the Snake River, soon learning why so few emigrants chose this method of travel. After days of running rapids and portaging around waterfalls Allen and his waterborne companions arrived at Fort Boise, knowing they were lucky to be alive. Here everyone agreed to give up water travel.

Allen remained at Fort Boise for four weeks, temporarily setting himself up in business. "Diary August 19: We found there was but one flat here to ferry the emigration over, and that discovery was the origin of the 'Pennsylvania Ferry Company." He left behind accounts of the ferry business and of the comings and goings at Fort Boise of Native Americans, Hudson's Bay Company employees, fur traders and travelers. Much of his account of these activities is new to historians.

After his sojourn at the ferry, Allen continued west on horseback. He was soon back on foot, however, and still lame, forced to walk through the desert country of eastern Oregon after losing his horse in the Blue Mountains. In October 1852, Allen reached Portland, Oregon Territory, and paused for a short time before heading north over the Cowlitz Trail to the small village of Olympia at the south end of Puget Sound. Allen was diverted on his journey north to serve as a delegate to the Monticello Convention where he participated in the beginnings of the political process that separated Washington Territory from Oregon. In December 1852, finally reaching his destination, Allen built a cabin on his Donation Land Claim three miles up Budd Inlet from Olympia. His decision to negotiate with local Indians to pay them for the land before he took up residence on it was remarkable for this time.

From late 1852 until January 1855, Allen remained in Washington Territory. In June 1853 he surveyed the Indian trail over Naches Pass in the Cascade Mountains as a potential route for a wagon road to divert incoming emigrants from the Willamette Valley to Puget Sound. From July through October he led a construction crew that began building the wagon road. That winter he explored Puget Sound to its northern reaches by whaleboat, ran for a position in the territorial senate (he lost), and shared his cabin with Captain George B. McClellan and George Gibbs (geologist), both on assignment to conduct various surveys of the newly created Washington Territory. Allen wrote up their reports and also created a dictionary of the Chinook Jargon at least as comprehensive as the better-known Gibbs dictionary. (This unpublished dictionary may be found in "Hervey Allen Papers," Special Collections Department, University of Pittsburgh.) In 1854 Allen and his crew returned to the mountains to improve the wagon road. He took time out from his road building to make the first ascent of Mount Adams.

Return to Pittsburgh
Allen returned to Pittsburgh in 1855 after three years out west. In July 1857 he married Elizabeth Robinson and together they raised five children. The outbreak of the Civil War found Allen constructing a railroad in today's West Virginia. He and his family were seized by Confederate forces and held captive until repatriated at Washington, D.C. He immediately offered his services to his friend, General McClellan, now commander of the Army of the Potomac. Circumstances instead took Allen to Virginia's Shenandoah Valley where he fought in the battles of Lewisburgh and Cross Keys. Allen later became a colonel in the 155th Pennsylvania Volunteer Infantry Regiment and fought at Fredericksburg and Gettysburg. He was medically discharged after Gettysburg but continued in a civilian role to provision the Union army in the Shenandoah Valley. (Allen's military history may be found in Under the Maltese Cross.)

Edward John (Jay) Allen was a member of the South Fork Fishing and Hunting Club, the club that owned Lake Conemaugh.

In the post-Civil War years Allen made his fortune serving as secretary/treasurer of the Atlantic and Pacific Telegraph Company. He made two later trips to Washington in 1889 and 1891. Edward Jay Allen died on December 26, 1915 and is buried in Homewood Cemetery, Pittsburgh, Pennsylvania.

References

External links
Hervey Allen Papers (1831-1965, SC.1952.01, Special Collections Department, University of Pittsburgh)
 Under the Maltese Cross
Colonel Edward Jay Allen at Find A Grave

Businesspeople from Pittsburgh
University of Pittsburgh alumni
1830 births
1915 deaths
Burials at Homewood Cemetery
19th-century American businesspeople